The Rice Bridge is the present city-centre bridge in Waterford, Ireland on the north side of the city. It was constructed in stages between 1982 and 1986, with an official opening of the first two lanes in 1984. It is named after Edmund Ignatius Rice (and occasionally also called the Edmund Rice Bridge or Brother Edmund Ignatius Rice Bridge). The Rice Bridge was constructed after the previous bridge was deemed unsafe.

See also
 River Suir Bridge

External links
 http://www.waterfordcity.ie/n25bypass/ricebridge.htm
 http://marinas.com/view/bridge/429_Edmund_Rice_Bridge_Waterford__Ireland
 http://en.structurae.de/structures/data/index.cfm?id=s0013448

Bridges in the Republic of Ireland
Buildings and structures in Waterford (city)
Transport in Waterford (city)